Wendlandia arabica is a species of plant in the family Rubiaceae. It is found in Somalia and Yemen, and is threatened by habitat loss.

References

arabica
Near threatened plants
Taxonomy articles created by Polbot